Auseklis was a pre-Christian Latvian god.
Auskelis may also refer to:
Auseklis Ozols (born 1941), Latvian-born American painter and fine arts educator
Auseklis Baušķenieks (1910–2007), Latvian painter
A pen name for Latvian poet and author Miķelis Krogzemis
Auseklis Limbazi Theatre, an amateur theatres in Limbaži, Latvia

Latvian masculine given names